The Dexing Coal Mine is a former coal mine in Xinyi District, Taipei, Taiwan.

History
The mine started its coal mining operation in 1897. Initially, each of the mine worker carried the mined coal to the docks. However, since each worker could only carry maximum four loads, it was deemed inefficient. Thus, cart lines were built linking the mine area at Wuxing Street to present-day location of Xinyi Administration Center Building another line to Songshan station. From there, coal was further transported by rail to various locations around Taiwan.

Its production peaked in 1946–1948. In 1980s, the mining became unsustainable due to recession and the rise of direct labor cost. The former coal mine was partially reopened as a tourist attraction in December 2015.

See also
 Mining in Taiwan

References

1897 establishments in Taiwan
Buildings and structures in Taipei
Former coal mines in Taiwan
Tourist attractions in Taipei